Covey is a surname. Notable people with the surname include:

Arthur Covey (1877-1960), American muralist
Britain Covey (born 1997), American football player
Craig Covey (born 1957), American politician
Dan Covey, American lighting designer
Deb Covey (born 1961), Canadian field hockey midfielder
Dylan Covey (born 1991), American baseball pitcher
Edward Covey (1805-1875), American slaveholder known to Frederick Douglass
Fred Covey (1881-1957), world champion in real tennis
Gerald Covey (born 1927), Canadian sprint canoer
Hyatt E. Covey (1975-1968), American politician
James Covey (1819–??), African interpreter
Joy Covey (1963–2013), American business executive
Preston Covey (c. 1941–2006), American philosophy professor
Rachel Covey (born 1998), American child actress
Richard O. Covey (born 1946), former astronaut
Rosemary Feit Covey, American printmaker
Sean Covey (born 1964), motivational speaker and author, son of the following
Stephen Covey (1932-2012), author of The Seven Habits of Highly Effective People
Stephen M. R. Covey, American author and speaker and son of the previous
Suzy Covey (1939-2007), librarian and scholar of comics

See also
Covey-Crump (surname)
Wendi McLendon-Covey, American actress